Extra extra or Marginella extra is a species of minute sea snail, a marine gastropod mollusk or micromollusk in the family Cystiscidae. Some malacologists place this genus more simply in the family Marginellidae.

Taxonomy 
Marginella extra was originally described under name Extra extra by French zoologist Félix Pierre Jousseaume in 1894. He placed this species to the monotypic genus Extra Jousseaume, 1894. Dautzenberg (1929) moved this species into genus Marginella.

Diagnosis 
The shell is minute, white, semitranslucent; prominent axial costae present; spire sunken but not immersed; lip strongly thickened, smooth, lacking denticulation, flared posteriorly; siphonal notch absent; posterior notch absent; distinct parietal callus "shield" present; columella multiplicate, with 5 plications plus parietal lirae, plications slightly excavated inside aperture due to parietal callus deposits.

Distribution and habitat 
Recorded only from western Indian Ocean along Madagascar, apparently in shallow water.

References

External links
  Coovert G. A. & Coovert H. K. (1995). "Revision of the Supraspecific Classification of Marginelliform Gastropods". The Nautilus 109(2 & 3):43–110

Cystiscidae
Gastropods described in 1894